The Lone Fire was a wildfire that burned at Pinnacle Lake in the Modoc National Forest in Modoc County, California in the United States. As of September 13, the fire has burned  and is 100% contained.

The fire

The Lone Fire was reported on September 5, around 4:14 p.m., near Pinnacle Lake, five miles southeast of Clear Lake Reservoir in Modoc National Forest in Modoc County, California. The fire, which is burning in grass, brush and juniper, was started by a lightning strike during thunderstorms in the area. The fire grew quickly to  due to strong winds and has spread east towards Boles Creek. Due to the fast growth, fire crews focused on building firelines and DC-10 Air Tankers dropped fire retardant around the fire's perimeter, to slow the fire's growth. As of September 11, the fire had burned  and was 92 percent contained. The fire is anticipated to be contained by September 12 due to an increase in humidity and lower temperatures.

References

External links
 

2019 California wildfires
Wildfires in Modoc County, California